al-Muradi may refer to:

 Abu Jafar al-Muradi, a 10th-century Egyptian grammarian
 Ibn Khalaf al-Muradi, an 11th-century Andalusian engineer
 Khalil al-Muradi, an 18th-century Syrian historian
 Muhammad Bey al-Muradi, a 17th-century Tunisian bey